Semes Kandeh-ye Olya (also Romanized as Semes Kandeh-ye ‘Olyā; also known as Semeskandeh, Semes Kandeh-ye Bālā, and Shas Kandeh) is a village in Miandorud-e Kuchak Rural District, in the Central District of Sari County, Mazandaran Province, Iran. At the 2006 census, its population was 3,237, in 857 families.

Famous People 
Ramin Rezaeian - Football Player

References 

Populated places in Sari County